Ffynnon-oer is a hamlet in the  community of Llanfihangel Ystrad, Ceredigion, Wales, which is 62.6 miles (100.8 km) from Cardiff and 177.4 miles (285.6 km) from London. Ffynnon-oer is represented in the Senedd by Elin Jones (Plaid Cymru) and the Member of Parliament is Ben Lake (Plaid Cymru).

Etymology
The name derives from the Welsh language: "Cold well".

References

See also
List of localities in Wales by population 

Villages in Ceredigion